Roscoe Engel (born 6 March 1989 in Cape Town) is a South African sprinter.

His personal bests are 10.06 in the 100 metres (+1.7 m/s, Pretoria 2018) and 20.44 in the 200 metres (+1.8 m/s, Pretoria 2018).

He also set a time of 15.17 over 150 meters (-0.3 m/s, Pretoria 2018) to beat Justin Gatlin the then reigning World 100m Champion.

Competition record

References

1989 births
Living people
South African male sprinters
Sportspeople from Cape Town
African Games competitors for South Africa
Athletes (track and field) at the 2015 African Games